(1517 – May 8, 1582?) was a Japanese , who served the , during the Sengoku period.

Nagahide was a trusted retainer of Kenshin's. He fought in the left flank at the 4th Battle of Kawanakajima (1561) and received a personal commendation from Kenshin for his bravery in the action. He supported Uesugi Kagekatsu during the Siege of Otate (1578).

Uesugi retainers
Samurai
1516 births
1582 deaths